Vancouver City Hall is home to Vancouver City Council in Vancouver, British Columbia, Canada. Located at 453 West 12th Avenue, the building was ordered by the Vancouver Civic Building Committee, designed by architect Fred Townley and Matheson, and built by Carter, Halls, Aldinger and Company.

The building is served by Broadway–City Hall station on the SkyTrain's Canada Line.

History
Between 1897 and 1929, the Vancouver City Hall was located on Main Street, just south of the Carnegie Library; that building had previously served as a public market and an auditorium. In 1929, City Hall moved into the Holden Building (built 1911), while the Main Street building became an extension of the Carnegie Library.

After being elected mayor in 1934, Gerry McGeer appointed a three-man committee to select the location for a new city hall; choices included the former Central School site at Victory Square, and Strathcona Park at the corner of Cambie Street and West 12th Avenue (no relation to the current park in the Strathcona neighbourhood). The panel recommended the Strathcona Park site, and City Council approved the selection in 1935, making Vancouver the first major Canadian city to locate its city hall outside its downtown.

Construction of the new City Hall began in 1936 (Vancouver's Golden Jubilee) on January 3, and the first cornerstone was laid by McGeer on July 2. A  statue of Capt. George Vancouver, by Charles Marega, was placed at the front of the building. It was unveiled on August 20 by the visiting Lord Mayor of London, Percy Vincent. Vincent also presented several gifts to the city, including a civic mace, and a sprig "...from a tree in the orchard where a falling apple gave Isaac Newton the idea that led to his theory of gravity". The mace and the statue still reside at city hall.

Construction on the building was begun the same year the opened. Construction cost $1 million, and was completed on December 1, 1936. Each lock plate on the outer doors displays the Vancouver Coat of Arms, and each door knob bears the monogram of the building. The ceiling on the second floor of the rotunda was made of gold leaf from several British Columbia mines.

After winning the civic election on December 9, 1936, George Clark Miller became the first mayor of Vancouver to occupy the then-new city hall, on January 2, 1937.

Construction on a four-storey east wing was begun in 1968 (completed in 1970) and in 2012, city staff gradually started moving out when a study found it would not withstand an earthquake. In 1969, a coat of arms was added, and the original building was declared a Schedule A heritage building in March 1976.

See also
List of old Canadian buildings
List of heritage buildings in Vancouver
Vancouver City Council

References

External links

 Learn about Vancouver City Hall - City of Vancouver official website
 History of Metropolitan Vancouver
 My Vancouver: City Hall
 CityMayors feature
 The Lovers II - Sculpture by Gerhard Juchum at City Hall

City and town halls in British Columbia
Art Deco architecture in Canada
Buildings and structures in Vancouver
Heritage buildings in Vancouver
Municipal government of Vancouver
Government buildings completed in 1936
Clock towers in Canada
Towers in British Columbia